Mark Santer (born 29 December 1936) is a retired Anglican bishop. He is the father of television producer Diederick Santer.

Early life and education
Santer was educated at Marlborough College and Queens' College, Cambridge, before his ordination in 1964.

Ordained ministry
After being a curate at Church of All Saints, Cuddesdon, he was a tutor at Ripon College Cuddesdon; Dean and Fellow of Clare College, Cambridge; assistant lecturer in divinity at the University of Cambridge and finally Principal of Westcott House, Cambridge before his ordination to the episcopate as area Bishop of Kensington in 1981.

After six years at Kensington, he was translated to be the Bishop of Birmingham. During this time he took part in the second phase of the ecumenical discussions of the Anglican—Roman Catholic International Commission and was embroiled in controversy over the use of the term "Winterval", which he opposed.

In retirement he has served as an assistant bishop in the Diocese of Worcester.

References

1936 births
People educated at Marlborough College
Alumni of Queens' College, Cambridge
Fellows of Clare College, Cambridge
Bishops of Kensington
Bishops of Birmingham
Living people
Staff of Westcott House, Cambridge
20th-century Church of England bishops